Acleris ruwenzorica is a species of moth of the  family Tortricidae. It is found in the Democratic Republic of Congo and Uganda.

References

Moths described in 2005
ruwenzorica
Moths of Africa